The 2022 Chicago Men's Challenger was a professional tennis tournament played on hard courts. It was the first edition of the tournament which was part of the 2022 ATP Challenger Tour. It took place in Chicago, United States between 8 and 14 August 2022.

Singles main draw entrants

Seeds

 1 Rankings as of 1 August 2022.

Other entrants
The following players received wildcards into the singles main draw:
  Aleksandar Kovacevic
  Govind Nanda
  Ben Shelton

The following player received entry into the singles main draw using a protected ranking:
  Bradley Klahn

The following players received entry into the singles main draw as alternates:
  Mikhail Kukushkin
  Genaro Alberto Olivieri

The following players received entry from the qualifying draw:
  Enzo Couacaud
  Billy Harris
  Ryan Harrison
  Brandon Holt
  Aidan McHugh
  Keegan Smith

The following players received entry as lucky losers:
  Zachary Svajda
  Li Tu
  Evan Zhu

Champions

Singles 

  Roman Safiullin def.  Ben Shelton 6–3, 4–6, 7–5.

Doubles 

  André Göransson /  Ben McLachlan def.  Evan King /  Mitchell Krueger 6–4, 6–7(3–7), [10–5].

References

Chicago Men's Challenger
Chicago Men's Challenger
August 2022 sports events in the United States